Hexepeolus is a genus of cuckoo bees in the family Apidae. There are at least two described species in Hexepeolus.

Species
These two species belong to the genus Hexepeolus:
 Hexepeolus mojavensis
 Hexepeolus rhodogyne Linsley & Michener, 1937

References

Further reading

External links

 

Nomadinae
Articles created by Qbugbot